St. Mary's College was a Catholic college in Delaware from  until .

St. Mary's College was founded in Wilmington, Delaware, in 1841 by Patrick Reilly. Incorporated January 29, 1847 by an Act of The state of Delaware sec 793 chapter 44.  Its enrollment peaked at 120 students in 1857.  Its fortunes declined during the American Civil War and it closed in 1866.

Sources
Catholic Encyclopedia article on Delaware

References

Defunct private universities and colleges in Delaware
Buildings and structures in Wilmington, Delaware
 
Defunct Catholic universities and colleges in the United States
Catholic universities and colleges in Delaware
Roman Catholic Diocese of Wilmington
Educational institutions established in 1841
1841 establishments in Delaware
1866 disestablishments in Delaware